Tansy was a traditional Easter food in medieval English cuisine. Its name came from the Tanacetum vulgare plant. The simplest version of the recipe was made by baking a batter flavored with green tansy juice. Later recipes, like the one from the 16th-century Good Housewife's Handbook added more ingredients like parsley, feverfew and violets to an egg batter that was fried like pancakes, though with a slightly green coloring from the addition of tansy and other herbs. Baked tansy could also be given a green color by adding spinach juice. An 18th-century recipe from The Compleat Housewife added sack to the batter and sweetened the fried tansies with gooseberries and a topping of crushed sugar.

Cakes and wine were a common feature of Easter traditions. Some 19th-century authors believed that the tradition of eating tansy cakes, which had a sweet and bitter flavor, was connected to Jewish traditions of eating cakes made with bitter herbs. Sometimes the tansy was closer to a pudding than a pancake, like Hannah Glasse's 18th-century recipe in the Art of Cookery, an elaborate dish with Naples biscuits, butter, cream, blanched almonds, eggs, grated bread, rose water, orange blossom water and other spices and sweeteners.

References

Easter cakes
Medieval cuisine
British cakes